The Shire of Moora is a local government area in the northern Wheatbelt region of Western Australia, and generally lies between the Brand Highway and Great Northern Highway about  north of Perth, the state capital.

History
The Moora Road District was gazetted on 11 December 1908, created from part of the Victoria Plains Road District. The first election for the Moora Road Board was on 12 February 1909. Henry Lefroy was elected Chairman at the first meeting of the Road Board on 19 March 1909. Lefroy had previously been elected Chairman of the Victoria Plains Road Board in 1876.

On 1 July 1961, Moora became a Shire under the Local Government Act 1960, which reformed all remaining road districts into shires.

Wards
The shire is undivided and the nine councillors represent the entire shire.

Until 20 October 2007, the shire was divided into wards, most with 1 councillor each:

 Moora Town Ward (4 councillors)
 Bindi Bindi
 Coomberdale
 Koojan
 Miling
 Watheroo

Towns and localities
The towns and localities of the Shire of Moora with population and size figures based on the most recent Australian census:

Population

Notable councillors
 Edgar Lewis, Moora Roads Board member 1936–1939; later a state MP
 Ray Jones, Moora Roads Board member 1948–1952; later a state MP

In popular culture
In January 2017, a video emblazoned with the seal of Shire of Moora was uploaded to YouTube. The video, showing a road being built, went viral, bringing unexpected attention to the area.

Heritage-listed places

As of 2023, 229 places are heritage-listed in the Shire of Moora, of which five are on the State Register of Heritage Places.

References

External links
 
 Moora Cemetery

Moora
Moora, Western Australia